Villa Flora Artist in Residency Program (in Slovenian: Likovna kolonija Villa Flora) is a program organised by Villa Flora in Slovenia.

History and program
Villa Flora Artist in Residency Program was founded by Slovenian painter Tjaša Iris in 2007. It hosted its first session in August - September 2008 and its second session in August - September 2009.

Villa Flora Artist in Residence Program serves to promote creative exploration and exchange among persons of diverse nationalities and backgrounds. It is historically the first Artist in Residence Program in Slovenia. The first in Slovenia to which artists from all over the world can apply to. It is suitable for artists who wish to change their environment for a couple of weeks and find inspiration in a new environment.

Villa Flora community of lively creators offers an inspirational and interactive setting for the Villa Flora Artist-In-Residence Program.

The selection is made by the founder - owner - painter Tjaša Iris and a rotating group of diverse artists, academics, critics and others that nominates potential candidates.

The aim is to make the Pre-coastal Slovenian art scene more vibrant as well as to contribute in the international exchange of artists and ideas: Slovenia / the rest of the world.

The residencies at Villa Flora are available for all disciplines of art and welcome visual artists, writers, poets, theatre groups, dancers, musicians, critics, curators, designers, architects and others.

Villa Flora is located in Branik (Italian: Rifembergo, German: Reifenberg) a village in western Slovenia in the municipality of Nova Gorica. Near Italian border. Half an hour from Trieste, an hour from Ljubljana, an hour and a half from Venice.

Organizational memberships

 Res Artis, a network of artist residencies
 Trans Artists Foundation an organization that informs about international artist in residence programs

Past guest artists

Diek Grobler (South Africa)
Mary Melilli (US)
Anna Puhakka (Finland)
Yeo Shih Yun

References

External links
 Villa Flora Artist in Residency Program, Branik, Slovenia, OFFICIAL WEB SITE www.zlatadolina.si/artist-in-residency 
 Tjaša Iris, Slovenian artist and founder of Villa Flora Artist in Residency Program, www.tjasairis.com  
 Branik valley web site: www.zlatadolina.si 
 Villa Flora Artist in Residency Program, video, in Slovenian: Likovna kolonija Villa Flora, TV Primorka, 30. 08. 2008 
 LIKOVNA KOLONIJA VILLA FLORA - 25. August – 8. September 2008, si21.com, 27. 08. 2008 
 Likovna kolonija z naslovom “trije kozmopolitski umetniki – three cosmopolitan artists, si21.com, 31.08.2009 
 Art Jam Session@Branik: Slikarski dogodek s Shih Yun Yeo (SG) in Katjo Pal (SI), 11.05.2010, 

Art and design organizations
Theatrical organizations
Cultural organizations based in Slovenia